The Arakan Army (abbreviated AA) is an ethnic armed organisation based in Rakhine State (Arakan). Founded on 10 April 2009, the AA is the military wing of the United League of Arakan (ULA). It is currently led by commander in chief Major General Twan Mrat Naing and vice deputy commander Brigadier General Nyo Twan Awng.

The AA has been fighting alongside the Kachin Independence Army (KIA) against the Tatmadaw (Myanmar Armed Forces) in the Kachin conflict. Most AA soldiers were originally trained at the KIA Military Academy. Since 2014, the AA has set up its own training camps in Rakhine State. According to the Myanmar Peace Monitor, the AA had more than 1,500 troops in 2014, including personnel stationed in the Rakhine State near Myanmar's border with Bangladesh. The Irrawaddy stated in September 2015 that the AA had more than 2,500 troops and 10,000 personnel in their civilian wing. In June 2020, the AA chief claimed that the group has more than 20,000 soldiers. In a December 2021 interview, Twan Mrat Naing claimed that the AA had grown to 30,000 troops.

Origin 
The Arakan Army (AA) was founded on 10 April 2009 along with its political wing, the United League of Arakan (ULA), in what it describes as its "temporary headquarters" in Laiza, Kachin State.

Following training, the group planned to return to Arakan State and fight for self-determination; however, with the outbreak of fighting in Kachin State in June 2011, they were unable to. As a result, they took up arms against the Myanmar Army in support of the KIA. In 2014, the AA started a settlement in Rakhine State near the border with Bangladesh and another near the border of Thai-Myanmar with which it has become much stronger and its combat abilities have been positively impacted. In February 2015, AA fought alongside the Myanmar Nationalities Democratic Alliance Army (MNDAA), an ethnic armed group, and its ally the Ta'ang National Liberation Army (TNLA) in their conflict with the Myanmar Army. Hundreds of Tatmadaw's soldiers were reportedly killed in this conflict. On 27 August 2015, there was a clash between the AA and Bangladesh border guard forces, with both sides opening fire near the Boro Modak area of Thanci in the Bandarban district, near the shared Burma-Bangladesh border. On 20 August 2015, the Arakan Army clashed with a Border Guards Bangladesh (BGB), after ten of their horses had been confiscated by the BGB earlier that day.

Objectives 
The Arakan Army purportedly advocates for self-determination for the multi-ethnic Arakanese population, the safeguarding and promotion of the national identity and cultural heritage of the Arakan people, and the "national dignity" and best interests of the Arakan people.

In an interview with the Arakha Media (AKK) conducted in August 2021, Commander-in-chief of the Arakan Army clearly stated that the political objective of the armed revolution is to restore the sovereignty of the Arakan, and there had been no bargaining in the attempt to regain the lost sovereignty and there would not be in the future either.

Armed conflict

Early Clashes

In April 2015, the AA clashed with the Myanmar Army in Kyauktaw Township of Rakhine State and Paletwa Township of Chin State.

An unknown number of military personnel were killed in the fighting. Several Tatmadaw personnel, including one commanding officer, were killed in sniper attacks. Many others were injured.

Following clashes between Rohingya insurgents and Burmese security forces in northern Rakhine State in October 2016, the Arakan Army released a press statement, calling the perpetrators (the Arakan Rohingya Salvation Army) "savage Bengali Muslim terrorists" and the violence a "rampage of the Bengali Islamic fundamentalist militants in northern Arakan."

In November 2017, Arakan Army was involved in heavy clashes with the Tatmadaw in Chin State, in which 11 Tatmadaw soldiers were killed.
According to the BBC, there was popular support for the Arakan Army in Mrauk U and a number of men from the town have recently joined the group.

2018-2020 war with the Tatmadaw 

On 21 December 2018, the Myanmar Army declared a four-month unilateral ceasefire in five conflict areas, saying it would hold talks with non-signatories of the Nationwide Ceasefire Agreement (NCA) during the ceasefire period. However, the Western Command (stationed in Chin State and Rakhine State) was notably excluded from the unilateral ceasefire announcement and an increase in clashes between the Tatmadaw and the Arakan Army was reported.

On 4 January 2019, around 300 members of the Arakan Army launched pre-dawn attacks on four border police outposts—Kyaung Taung, Nga Myin Taw, Ka Htee La and Kone Myint—in northern Buthidaung Township. Thirteen members of the Border Guard Police (BGP) were killed and nine others were injured, whilst 40 firearms and more than 10,000 rounds of ammunition were taken by the Arakan Army. The Arakan Army later stated that it had captured nine BGP personnel and five civilians, and that three of its fighters were also killed in the attacks. Following the attacks, the Office of the President of Myanmar held a high-level meeting on national security in the capital Naypyidaw on 7 January 2019, and instructed the Defense Ministry to increase troop deployments in the areas that were attacked and to use aircraft if necessary.

Myanmar Army soldiers from the 22nd Light Infantry Division, elements of the 66th and 99th Light Infantry Divisions, and battalions from the Western Command of the Tatmadaw were reportedly involved in the subsequent military offensive against the Arakan Army. Clashes were reported in Maungdaw, Buthidaung, Kyauktaw, Rathedaung and Ponnagyun Townships, located in the northern and central parts of Rakhine State. The Rakhine State government issued a notice blocking non-governmental organisations and UN agencies, except for the International Committee of the Red Cross and the World Food Programme, from travelling to rural areas in these townships affected by the conflict. The fighting prompted 5,000 civilians to flee from their homes and to take shelter in monasteries and communal areas across the region, according to the UN Office for the Coordination of Humanitarian Affairs. Civilian casualties, arbitrary detention of ethnic Rakhine villagers, and military blockage of food aid and medical relief were also reported.

On 9 March 2019, around 60 AA insurgents launched an evening attack on Yoe-ta-yoke Police Station. According to a leaked combat report, nine policemen were killed, two were injured, and a dozen weapons, including 10 BA-63 assault rifles, were stolen by the attackers. On the same day, AA insurgents managed to conquer the front line commanding post of Rakhine State's Gwa Township-based No. 563 Light Infantry Battalion under the supervision of Light Infantry Division No. 5. According to a press release by the Arakan Army, 11 personnel, including four military engineers, were captured and 16 backhoe excavators, one Toyota car, a dump truck, and 60 mm and 80 mm mortars were confiscated. In April, around 200 AA insurgents attacked the No. 31 Police Security Unit at 10 pm. The Tatmadaw retaliated with fighter jets, bombing AA positions until 6 am the next day. 

On 22 September, fighting broke out near Taunggyi Village in Myebon Township, as the ceasefire expired. In October, AA soldiers captured a ferry on the Mayu River between Sittwe to Buthidaung Township and abducted a group 58 passengers, which included soldiers, police officers and government workers. A rescue attempt by the Tatmadaw using a helicopter resulted in exchange of gunfire, killing several of the hostages.

On 6 February 2020, the Arakan Army attacked an outpost of the Tatmadaw on a bank of Kaladan River in Chin State. Fighting continued for weeks and peaked in the second week of March when the Arakan Army claimed it had captured 36 soldiers, including a battalion commander. On 19 March 2020, the Tatmadaw made a statement claiming that its forces could break the Arakan Army's siege of the outpost.

On 26 May 2020, the Arakan Army released a statement demanding the immediate withdrawal of Burmese Government administration and Burmese armed forces from Arakan. In January 2019, Myanmar's Anti-Terrorism Central Committee designated Arakan Army as a terrorist group under the country's counter-terrorism law.

AA and the central government reached a ceasefire in November 2020. At the time of the ceasefire, Myanmar's control had been severely eroded in central and northern Rakhine state, leaving a vacuum that the Arakan Army would fill out of the next 18 months. AA rolled out many public services, like COVID-19 vaccines and local administrators in northern Rakhine state.

2021-2023 Myanmar civil war 

After the 2021 Myanmar coup d'état, however, both the military junta and government-in-exile withdrew its designation of the AA as a terrorist group. The State Administration Council (SAC) withdrew its designation on 11 March 2021, while the Committee Representing Pyidaungsu Hluttaw (CRPH) announced a few days later that it was rescinding its terrorist designation for all insurgent groups. Nevertheless, on 30 March, the AA have threatened to end the ceasefire with the Tatmadaw should the SAC refuse to order a halt to the massacre of civilians protesting the coup. On 10 April 2021, the AA alongside its allies, TNLA and MNDAA, launched an attack on a police station south of Lashio in Shan State, killing at least 14 police officers and burning the station to the ground.

Between June and August 2022, the informal ceasefire in late 2020 between the Arakan Army and the junta broke down. With the military's attention on the increasing resistance elsewhere and increasing popular support to partner with the NUG, AA began to seek an expansion of its influence into southern Rakhine. Rhetoric from AA leader Twan Mrat Naing in June grew more provocative with military spokespeople stating that AA was inviting conflict.

Armed clashes resumed in July after the junta launched an airstrike against an AA base in Kayin State, killing 6 AA soldiers. AA retaliated in Maungdaw Township 12 days later killing four and capturing fourteen junta soldiers. Armed clashes broke out in northern Rakhine and western Chin State in late July and early August, including in the city of Paletwa, chin State. By late August, travel to northern Rakhine required notifying series of checkpoints and all public transport ships ceased operating. Both AA and the junta placed blockaded and strict prior notice for all travelers attempting to cross river and land blockades. The renewed war was markedly different as the junta had significantly less morale and the AA was now part of a popular de-facto alliance with NUG-led resistance forces. 

On 26 November, the Arakan Army and the Junta agreed to a temporary ceasefire starting on 27 November. Yōhei Sasakawa of the Nippon Foundation brokered the ceasefire by acting as an intermediary. Arakan Army spokespeople maintain that they agreed to it for humanitarian reasons and not because of international pressure. The Arakan Army did not withdraw from fortifications held at the time of the ceasefire. Junta spokespeople say that this is the first step towards a permanent ceasefire with the Arakan Army. As of mid-December, tensions remained high with forces from both sides remaining in deployment within northern Rakhine State.

International arrests 
In July 2019, the Myanmar Police, in cooperation with the government of Singapore, arrested AA leader Twan Mrat Naing's younger brother, Aung Mrat Kyaw, along with others who were accused of financially supporting the AA. In September, his younger sister and brother-in-law were also detained by Myanmar Police when they returned to Myanmar from Thailand.

On 6 December, Twan Mrat Naing's wife Hnin Zar Phyu and their two children were detained by Thai immigration officials in Chiang Mai. Officials arrested her due to the presence of her name on the list of people affiliated with the Arakan Army, provided by the Myanmar Government. On 25 February 2020, the detained family left for Switzerland under the political asylum initiated by the UNHCR.

On 23 June 2020, Thai authorities raided a house in the border town of Mae Sot (close to Kayin State), seizing a large stash of newly manufactured weapons originating from China. Local insurgents on the Burmese side of the border told The Irrawaddy that the weapons were likely being smuggled for the Arakan Army because "they pay good prices".

References

External links 
 Arakan Army's old website
 Arakan Army's old website
 Arakan Army's old website

Rebel groups in Myanmar
Paramilitary organisations based in Myanmar
Organizations designated as terrorist by Myanmar